Stephen F. King  (1844 – July 8, 1895) was an American professional baseball player who played in the National Association as a left fielder for the 1871–1872 Troy Haymakers. He was 5' 9" and weighed 175 lb.

Career
King was born in Lansingburgh, New York, in 1844. From 1866 to 1870, he played for a team alternately called the Unions of Lansingburgh and the Haymakers of Troy. Then, the National Association was formed, and King played for the Troy Haymakers team in 1871 and 1872. He was among the better outfielders in the league in 1871, batting .396 with 34 RBI in 29 games. He finished fourth in the batting race. The following season, King hit .305, and he never appeared in the major leagues again. He died in Lansingburgh in 1895.  He was buried at Oakwood Cemetery in Troy, New York.

References

External links

1844 births
1895 deaths
19th-century baseball players
Major League Baseball left fielders
Troy Haymakers (NABBP) players
Troy Haymakers players
Troy Haymakers (minor league) players
Baseball players from New York (state)
People from Lansingburgh, New York
Burials at Oakwood Cemetery (Troy, New York)